Magistrate's Court is a Canadian television series airing weekdays in syndication from 1963–1969. The show is a dramatization of the day-to-day life of a police magistrate, portrayed by Roy Jacques. The series was produced by Rai Purdy.

External links 
 
 Magistrate's Court at TVArchive.ca

1960s Canadian drama television series
First-run syndicated television shows in Canada
1963 Canadian television series debuts
1969 Canadian television series endings